Summerville is a settlement in Newfoundland and Labrador. It was previously known as Indian Arm; the first Waymaster was Edward Humby in 1891.

See also
 List of communities in Newfoundland and Labrador

External links
 People buried at Indian Arm, Bonavista Bay

Populated places in Newfoundland and Labrador